is a Japanese comedian, actor and businessman. He is nicknamed .

Biography
After graduating from Sayama High School, he was a local swimming instructor, but he aimed for being an idol in Tokyo. During the showbub period, he lived in Hiromi's room.  In 1986, together with Hiromi and Mister Chin, he formed the conte group B-21 Special.  They won the Golden Arrow Award for Performing Arts in 1990.

After that, Ito planned to regenerate in which he had been as a sluggish celebrity within regular appearances in Tunnels no Namade Daradara ika sete!!, in the Fukuoka ramen shop "Ippudo" for training. At that time Ito was injured in his feet, as the above project was around when he was worried about continuing in the entertainment industry, he decided to retire from the front line of entertainment industry and started a ramen business.  Currently there are six shop ramen shops named "Debitto" ("Debi" at the beginning) nationwide (Nakanobu Main Store, Sakurashinmachi Store, Ito-Yokado Yamato Tsurumi Store, Higashi Shizuoka Store, Sayama Store, Tachikawa Store), and two overseas stores (Macao shop ("Shinju shop"), Shanghai shop), he was doing research on soup on the second floor of the Nakanobu branch, and sometimes he stand at the store. The company consolidates opinions by the meeting three times a year by all employees.  He temporarily stayed in ramen store management, but TBS' "Seija no Kōshin" co-star Chosuke Ikariya visited the shop without previous notice, even though a few words, "If I try to give back to the entertainment industry Having received a strong invitation with enthusiasm including "why did I not give back to the entertainment industry?", and in parallel with the ramen shop, he is doing a celebrity business such as an actor.

Filmography

TV dramas

Internet dramas

Internet programmes

TV programmes

Radio

Films

Direct-to-video

Stage

Music

Voice acting

Advertisements

Narration

Video games

References

External links
 – Orega 
 
 

Japanese comedians
Japanese television personalities
Japanese male film actors
Japanese male stage actors
Japanese male television actors
Japanese male voice actors
Japanese businesspeople
Actors from Saitama Prefecture
1966 births
Living people
20th-century Japanese male actors
21st-century Japanese male actors